Rayagada  railway station serves Rayagada district in the Indian state of Odisha. It is one of the 3 railway divisions of East Coast Railway.

History
The  Vizianagaram–Parvatipuram line was opened in 1908–09 and an extension to Salur was built in 1913. The Parvatipuram–Raipur line was completed in 1931.

The Koraput–Rayagada Rail Link Project was completed on 31 December 1998.

Paper mill
J. K. Organisation operates a paper mill near Rayagada.

Amenities
Rayagada railway station has a double-bedded non-AC retiring room and a six-bedded dormitory.

Passenger movement
See Rayagada district and Gunupur for more details of railway lines in the district.

Some important train that origins/terminates :

References

Railway stations in Rayagada district
Railway junction stations in India
Waltair railway division
Railway stations opened in 1931
1931 establishments in India